Sophronia may refer to:

People
 Sophronia Bucklin (1828–1902), American Civil War nurse
 Sophronia Woodruff Dews, co-founder of Alpha Delta Pi sorority
 Sophronia Farrington Naylor Grubb (1834–1902), American activist
 Sophronia Smith (1803–1876), member of the Smith family (Latter Day Saints)
 Sophronia Wilson Wagoner (1834–1929), pioneer missionary and leader in social work

Other uses
 Cattleya syn. Sophronia, a genus of orchid
 Sophronia (moth), a genus of moth

See also 
 Sofronia
 Sophronius (disambiguation)
 Sophronica
 Sofron
 Sofronie
 Sofronije